The 1932 South American Basketball Championship was the 2nd edition of this regional tournament.  It was held in Santiago, Chile and won by Uruguay.

Final rankings

Results

Preliminary round

Each team played the other two teams twice apiece, for a total of four games played by each team.

Uruguay's loss to Chile was its first defeat; nevertheless it took the top seed in the preliminary round.

Final

As Uruguay and Chile finished level on points, a play-off match for the championship was required.

Uruguay won the final to claim its second South American title.

External links

FIBA.com archive for SAC1932

1932
Champ
B
Sports competitions in Santiago
1930s in Santiago, Chile
South American Basketball Championship
South American Basketball Championship